Bronwyn Eagles  (born 23 August 1980) is an Australian Olympic athlete who competes in the hammer throw.

Eagles won one junior and six Australian Championships in the women's hammer throw event in her career. Other career highlights include a bronze medal at the World Championships and a silver medal at the Commonwealth Games.

In 2008, two years after her retirement, Eagles resumed competition and went on to win her sixth national title at the Australian Championships.

Achievements

National championships
 Hammer throw: 2001, 2002, 2004, 2005, 2008, 2009 (6)

See also
 Australian athletics champions (Women)

References

External links

1980 births
Living people
Australian female hammer throwers
Athletes (track and field) at the 2002 Commonwealth Games
Athletes (track and field) at the 2010 Commonwealth Games
Athletes (track and field) at the 2004 Summer Olympics
Olympic athletes of Australia
Commonwealth Games silver medallists for Australia
World Athletics Championships medalists
Commonwealth Games medallists in athletics
Oceanian Athletics Championships winners
21st-century Australian women
Medallists at the 2002 Commonwealth Games